Anusapati, Anushanatha, or Anushapati, is the second king of Singhasari, an Indianized Hindu kingdom located in east Java between 1222 and 1248.

He was the son of Tunggul Ametung, the first husband of Ken Dedes.  Anushapati assassinated Ken Arok in 1227, avenging his father's death.

The semi-mythical Pararaton, a Javanese historical chronicle, states that Tunggul Ametung, the ruler of the minor Javanese kingdom of Tumapel, was killed by the first king of Singhasari Ken Arok using a cursed kris, a type of Javanese knife, forged by Mpu Gandring. After he killed Tunggul Ametung, Ken Arok married Ken Dedes and formed the kingdom of Singhasari. The Pararaton alleges that Anusapati used the same cursed kris to kill Ken Arok.

According to the Pararaton, Anusapati was killed by his half-brother, Panji Tohjaya, using the same kris he used to kill Ken Arok.

See also
Kidal Temple
Greater India
Indosphere
Hinduism in Indonesia

References

Singhasari
Indonesian Hindu monarchs
1248 deaths
13th-century Indonesian people